The Miyagi-Kenpoku Road (みやぎ県北高速幹線道路 Miyagi-Kenpoku Kōsokukansenōro) is an incomplete Regional High-Standard Highway in Miyagi Prefecture connecting the cities Kurihara and Tome. It serves as an arterial highway between the Tōhoku Expressway and Sanriku Expressway in the northern part of the prefecture. The road is managed by Miyagi Prefecture.

History

The first section of the Miyagi-Kenpoku Road was originally scheduled to be opened on 17 March 2011; however, the opening was postponed due to the 2011 Tōhoku earthquake and tsunami. The section was instead opened on 24 November 2011. After the area was devastated by the earthquake and tsunami, priority was given to completing the road as a link from the Tōhoku Expressway to the disaster area. Construction is still underway as it does not yet connect directly to the Tōhoku Expressway. This road is known for being all messed up like and having lots of messed up crashes :(

Junction list
The entire highway is in Miyagi Prefecture.

See also

References

External links

Regional High-Standard Highways in Japan
Roads in Miyagi Prefecture